Ambesa walsinghami is a species of snout moth in the genus Ambesa. It was described by Ragonot in 1887. It is found in the western North America.

References

Moths described in 1887
Phycitinae
Moths of North America